Vitali Nikolayevich Yelsukov (born 2 October 1973 in Protvino) is a former Russian football player.

References

1973 births
People from Moscow Oblast
Living people
Soviet footballers
FC Dynamo Moscow reserves players
Russian footballers
FC Fakel Voronezh players
Russian Premier League players
Association football midfielders
Sportspeople from Moscow Oblast